The eighth Inter-Cities Fairs Cup was played over the 1965–66 season. The competition was won by Barcelona over two legs in an all-Spanish final against Zaragoza. It was the sixth and final time that a Spanish side won the competition, and Barcelona's third title.

First round

First leg

Second leg

Chelsea won 4–1 on aggregate.

RC Strasbourg 2–2 Milan on aggregate.

Milan 1–1 RC Strasbourg in play-off. Milan advanced on a coin toss.

Fiorentina won 7–1 on aggregate.

Leeds United won 2–1 on aggregate.

Second round

First leg

Second leg
Steagul Roșu Brașov won 3–2 on aggregate.

Real Zaragoza won 3–2 on aggregate.

Leeds won 2–1 on aggregate.

Milan 2–2 GD CUF on aggregate.

Milan won 1–0 in play-off.

Spartak Brno won 4–2 on aggregate.

Valencia won 8–2 on aggregate.

Third round

First leg

Second leg

Steagul Roșu 5–5 Espanyol on aggregate.

Chelsea 3–3 Milan on aggregate.

Milan 1–1 Chelsea in play-off. Chelsea advanced on a coin toss.

Leeds won 2–1 on aggregate.

Quarter-finals

|}

First leg

Second leg

Leeds won 5–2 on aggregate.

Semi-finals

First leg

Second leg

Leeds – Zaragoza 2–2 on aggregate, replay is needed. Leeds won toss to play at home

Zaragoza won 5–3 on aggregate.

Chelsea – Barcelona 2–2 on aggregate, replay is needed. Barcelona won toss to play at home

Barcelona won 7–2 on aggregate.

Final 

|}

External links 
 Inter-Cities Fairs Cup results at Rec.Sport.Soccer Statistics Foundation

2
Inter-Cities Fairs Cup seasons